Megachile latimanus, or the broad-handed leafcutter, is a species of bee in the family Megachilidae. It was described by Thomas Say in 1823.

References

latimanus
Insects described in 1823